Phaegoptera ochracea is a moth of the family Erebidae. It was described by James John Joicey and George Talbot in 1918. It is found in Peru.

References

Phaegoptera
Moths described in 1918